The 1997–98 South Carolina Gamecocks men's basketball team represented the University of South Carolina as a member of the Southeastern Conference during the 1997–98 men's college basketball season. The team was led by head coach Eddie Fogler and played their home games at Carolina Coliseum in Columbia, South Carolina. The team finished second in the SEC East regular season standings and received an at-large bid to the 1998 NCAA tournament as No. 3 seed in the East region. The Gamecocks lost to 14 seed Richmond in the first round to finish the season with a record of 23–8 (11–5 SEC).

Roster

Schedule and results

|-
!colspan=9 style= | Regular Season

|-
!colspan=9 style= | SEC Tournament

|-
!colspan=9 style= | NCAA Tournament

Rankings

References

South Carolina Gamecocks men's basketball seasons
South Car
South Carolina
South Carolina Gamecocks Men's Basketball
South Carolina Gamecocks Men's Basketball